Heja Roland! is a 1966 Swedish comedy film directed by Bo Widerberg. The film won the Guldbagge Award for Best Film and Thommy Berggren won the award for Best Actor at the 3rd Guldbagge Awards.

Cast
 Thommy Berggren as Roland Jung
 Mona Malm as Hanna Jung
 Ulf Palme as Ö.J.
 Holger Löwenadler as Waldemar Vassén
 Ingvar Kjellson as Skog
 Carl Billquist as Svensson
 Lars Göran Carlsson as Mortell (as Lars Göran Carlson)
 Lars Amble as Sture Lennert
 Carl-Olof Alm as Man at Horse Race
 Madelaine Sundgren as Britt Lennert

References

External links
 
 

1966 films
1966 comedy films
Swedish comedy films
1960s Swedish-language films
Swedish black-and-white films
Best Film Guldbagge Award winners
Films directed by Bo Widerberg
1960s Swedish films